To avoid confusion, all the names on this list follow the Eastern order convention (family name first, given name second) for consistency.

This is a list of all the vice presidents of the Republic of China (1912–present).

Timeline

List 
Provisional Government: 
 
Beiyang Government: 

Constitutional Government:

Vice presidential age-related data (post-1947 Constitution)

Oldest living 
Green text and an asterisk mark the inauguration date of a vice president older than any living ex-vice president. Other dates are the deaths of the then-oldest vice president.

Notes

See also 
 List of vice presidents of the Republic of China by other offices held
 List of presidents of the Republic of China
 List of premiers of the Republic of China
 List of political office-holders of the Republic of China by age

Vice Presidents
Republic of China
Political office-holders in the Republic of China on Taiwan
Political office-holders in the Republic of China
Vice President